Gerhard Schulz (1 June 1931 – 2 October 2008) was a German equestrian who competed in the sport of eventing. He was born in Hartensdorf, Brandenburg. He won the bronze medal at the 1964 Summer Olympics. He competed for the SC Dynamo Hoppegarten / Sportvereinigung (SV) Dynamo.

References 

1931 births
2008 deaths
German male equestrians
Olympic equestrians of the United Team of Germany
Olympic bronze medalists for the United Team of Germany
Olympic medalists in equestrian
Equestrians at the 1960 Summer Olympics
Equestrians at the 1964 Summer Olympics
Medalists at the 1964 Summer Olympics
Sportspeople from Brandenburg